John Francis Moore, SMA (12 January 1942 in Dublin, Ireland – 20 January 2010) was the Bishop of the Diocese of Bauchi, Nigeria. He was ordained a priest on 20 December 1965 for the Society of African Missions.

Bishop Moore was born on 12 January 1942 in the parish of Harold's Cross, Dublin, in the Archdiocese of Dublin, the second son of John and Mary Moore (née Broughal). He was educated at the Christian Brothers Secondary School, Synge Street, Dublin from 1955 to 1959. In 1960 he became a member of the SMA. From 1960 to 1966 he studied Philosophy and Theology at the SMA Major seminary at Dromantine House, Newry, Co Down. Right Reverend Eugene Doherty, Bishop of Dromore, ordained him to the priesthood on 20 December 1965 in St Colman's Cathedral, Newry.

On 5 July 1996 he was appointed Vicar Apostolic of Bauchi and Titular Bishop of Gigthi, and ordained on
7 November 1996 by Bishop Gabriel Ganaka.

References

1942 births
2010 deaths
20th-century Roman Catholic bishops in Nigeria
21st-century Roman Catholic bishops in Nigeria
Irish expatriate Catholic bishops
People from Harold's Cross
People educated at Synge Street CBS
Roman Catholic bishops of Bauchi

Society of African Missions